Rachel Katherine Schofield (born 13 March 1976 in Winchester, Hampshire) is an English journalist and news presenter.

Education
Schofield was educated at St Margaret's School, Exeter, an independent school for girls.

She obtained a first class degree in Modern European Languages (French, German and Italian) at Durham University (St John's College), where she joined Purple FM. She was at Durham from 1994–98, spending a year in Vienna. From 1998–99, she did a Broadcast Journalism course at the London College of Printing (now called the London College of Communication).

Radio and television career
She started her career at the BBC on BBC Radio Newcastle in 1999 and also reported for BBC Look North. She then moved to be a reporter for BBC Radio 4 before joining BBC News. Schofield resigned from her position in September 2012 although has returned on a freelance basis.

At the beginning of September 2020, she co-hosted the Jeremy Vine show for one week, standing in for the regular show co-host Storm Huntley.

Personal life
She met the then Newsnight reporter Jeremy Vine in the run-up to the 2001 general election when he was touring Britain in a VW camper van. The couple married in 2002 and live in west London with their two daughters.

References

External links
 
 Rachel Schofield Q and A's TV Newsroom

1976 births
Living people
English journalists
BBC newsreaders and journalists
Mass media people from Exeter
Mass media people from Winchester
Alumni of St John's College, Durham